Tom Plezha was an Albanian leader chosen at the Convention of Mat to negotiate with the Pope an alliance against the Ottoman Empire.

Life
Tom Plezha held the title Captain serving the Republic of Venice. He took part in the Battle of Lepanto in 1571 and was taken prisoner of war by Ottomans. After gaining freedom, he decided to not serve Venetians again and joined Albanian leaders in organization of Albanian revolts against the Ottoman Empire. He participated in the Convention of Mat which was organized on November 7, 1594 by Albanian leaders. The convention decided that help should be sought from the Pope, and the trusted and experienced leaders Tom Plezha, Mark Gjini and Nikollë Mekajshi were chosen to undertake the negotiations.

Legacy
There is a street in Tirana named after Tom Plezha in memory of his contribution to the Albanian struggle for independence.

See also
 Ottoman Albania

References

Sources

16th-century Albanian people